Stenocarpus villosus is a species of plant in the family Proteaceae. It is endemic to New Caledonia.  It is threatened by habitat loss.

References

Endemic flora of New Caledonia
villosus
Critically endangered plants
Taxonomy articles created by Polbot
Taxa named by Jean Antoine Arthur Gris
Taxa named by Adolphe-Théodore Brongniart